The Men's freestyle 125 kg wrestling competitions at the 2022 Commonwealth Games in Birmingham, England took place on 5 August at the Coventry Arena. A total of ten competitors from ten nations took part.

Results
The draw is as follows:

Repechage

References

External link
 Results
 

Wrestling at the 2022 Commonwealth Games